The phonology of Welsh is characterised by a number of sounds that do not occur in English and are rare in European languages, such as the voiceless alveolar lateral fricative  and several voiceless sonorants (nasals and liquids), some of which result from consonant mutation. Stress usually falls on the penultimate syllable in polysyllabic words, while the word-final unstressed syllable receives a higher pitch than the stressed syllable.

Consonants
Welsh has the following consonant phonemes:

Symbols in parentheses are either allophones, or found only in loanwords. The postalveolar affricates  and  occur mainly in loanwords, e.g. The voiceless nasals  occur mostly word-initially, as a consequence of nasal mutation. These nasals have recently been interpreted as sequences of  + . ('six') pronounced .

'language' becomes   'her language'. It also occurs in some Northern dialects as the cluster  in place of intervocalic  in words like  ('out') where it is pronounced  rather than the more common (and standard) .

The fricatives  tend not to be pronounced in certain contexts, e.g. Historically, this occurred so often with the voiced velar fricative that it disappeared entirely from the language. The occurrence and distribution of the phoneme  varies from area to area. ('talk'), although it appears in borrowings, e.g. ('shop'). In northern accents, it can occur when  precedes , e.g. ('I went'). ('month').

In some dialects of north-western Welsh, the  phoneme is consistently velarised or "dark" (not to be confused with ) in all positions, but remains unvelarised or "clear" in the south, except in rare exceptions where  is found after , e.g.   'pretty'.

Vowels

The vowel phonemes of Welsh are as follows:

In all dialects, the contrast between long and short vowels is found in stressed penultimate syllables of polysyllabic words or in monosyllabic words.

The vowel  does not occur in the final syllable of words (except a few monosyllabic proclitics). It is always pronounced short except when emphasised in the name of the letter .

The long counterpart to short  is sometimes misleadingly transcribed . This is often found in solely quality-distinctive transcriptions to avoid using a length mark.

There is a general tendency in the South to simplify diphthongs in everyday speech, e.g.

Stress and pitch
Stress in polysyllabic words occurs most commonly on the penultimate syllable, more rarely on the final syllable (e.g. verbs ending in -áu). According to its positioning, related words or concepts (or even plurals) can sound quite different, as syllables are added to the end of a word and the stress moves correspondingly:

This is because the pronunciation of  depends on whether or not it is in the final syllable.

Stress on penultimate syllables is characterised by a low pitch, which is followed by a high pitch on the (unstressed) word-final syllable. In words where stress is on the final syllable, that syllable also bears the high pitch. This high pitch is a remnant of the high-pitched word-final stress of early Old Welsh (derived from original penultimate stress in Common Brittonic by the loss of final syllables); the stress shift from final to penultimate occurred in the Old Welsh period without affecting the overall pitch of the word.

References

Welsh grammar
Celtic phonologies